Anna Tőkés (March 1, 1903 – December 25, 1966) was a Hungarian stage and film actress. Tőkés  was a Transylvanian born in what is today Târgu Mureș in Romania, but was then part of the Austro-Hungarian Empire. Like many ethnic Hungarians, she moved to Hungary following the First World War. She starred in the 1936 First World War film Cafe Moscow.

Selected filmography
 Cafe Moscow (1936)
 The State Department Store (1953)

References

Bibliography 
 István Nemeskürty & Tibor Szántó. A Pictorial Guide to the Hungarian Cinema, 1901-1984. Helikon, 1985.

External links 
 

1903 births
1966 deaths
People from Târgu Mureș
Hungarian film actresses
Hungarian stage actresses
20th-century Hungarian actresses